Charlotte Gray, CM (born January 3, 1948) is a British born Canadian historian and author. The Winnipeg Free Press has called her "one of Canada's best loved writers of popular history and literary biography."

Early life and education
Born in Sheffield, England and educated at Oxford University and the London School of Economics, Gray came to Canada in 1979.

Career
She worked for a number of years as a journalist, writing a regular column on national politics for Saturday Night and appearing regularly on radio and television discussion panels. She has also written for Chatelaine, The Globe and Mail, the National Post and the Ottawa Citizen.

Gray is an adjunct research professor in the Department of History at Carleton University, and holds honorary degrees from Mount Saint Vincent University in Halifax, the University of Ottawa and Queen's University. She was awarded the UBC Medal for Canadian Biography in 2002 and the Pierre Berton Prize for distinguished achievement in popularizing and promoting Canadian history in 2003. She has won or been nominated for most of the major non-fiction awards in Canada. In 2004 she served on the jury for the prestigious Scotiabank Giller Prize. In 2007, she was made a Member of the Order of Canada.

In 2004, Gray appeared on the CBC Television series The Greatest Canadian advocating for Sir John A. Macdonald, Canada's first Prime Minister.

Personal life
Gray lives in New Edinburgh, a neighbourhood in Ottawa.  She is married to George Anderson, the president of an organization called the Forum of Federations, and former Deputy Minister of Natural Resources Canada and before that of Intergovernmental Affairs. They have three sons.

Awards and honours
In 2016, Literary Review of Canada listed Sisters in the Wilderness among the top 25 most influential Canadian books in the past 25 years.

The Globe and Mail included Murdered Midas on their "The Globe 100: Books that shaped 2019" list.

Publications
 Mrs. King: The Life and Times of Isabel Mackenzie King. 1997
 Sisters in the Wilderness: The Lives of Susanna Moodie and Catharine Parr Traill. 1999
 Flint & Feather: The Life and Times of E. Pauline Johnson, Tekahionwake. 2002
 Canada, A Portrait in Letters. 2003
 The Museum Called Canada. 2004
 Reluctant Genius: The Passionate Life and Inventive Mind of Alexander Graham Bell  2006
 Extraordinary Canadians: Nellie McClung  2008
 Gold Diggers: Striking it Rich in the Klondike 2010
 The Massey Murder: A Maid, Her Master and the Trial that Shocked a Country 2013
 The Promise of Canada 2016
 Murdered Midas: A Millionaire, His Gold Mine, and a Strange Death on an Island Paradise, HarperCollins, 2019 (Covers the life and death of Sir Harry Oakes)

References

External links
 Author site
 HarperCollins Canada site

1948 births
Canadian women historians
Living people
English emigrants to Canada
Alumni of the London School of Economics
Carleton University alumni
Members of the Order of Canada
Writers from Ottawa